Changal Dasht (also Romanized as Changāl Dasht; also known as Changāl Vash) is a village in Dastjerd Rural District, Alamut-e Gharbi District, Qazvin County, Qazvin Province, Iran. At the 2006 census, its population was 34, in 10 families.

References 

Populated places in Qazvin County